The Maratha Empire, also referred to as the Maratha Confederacy, was an early modern Indian confederation that rose to dominate much of the Indian subcontinent in the 18th century. Maratha rule formally began in 1674 with the coronation of Shivaji of the Bhonsle Dynasty as the Chhatrapati (Marathi: "The title "Chhatrapati" was created by Shivaji upon his coronation"). Although Shivaji came from the Maratha caste, the Maratha empire also included warriors, administrators and other notables from Maratha and several other castes from Maharashtra.

They are largely credited for ending Mughal control over the Indian subcontinent and establishing the Maratha Empire. The religious attitude of Mughal Emperor Aurangzeb estranged non-Muslims, and his inability to finish the resulting Maratha uprising after a  27-year war at a great cost to his men and treasure, eventually ensued Maratha ascendency and control over sizeable portions of former Mughal lands in the north or about 1/3 of the subcontinent by 1757. Maratha rule officially ended in 1818 with the defeat of Peshwa Bajirao II at the hands of the British East India Company in Third Anglo-Maratha War.

The Marathas were a Marathi-speaking warrior group from the western Deccan Plateau (present-day Maharashtra) who rose to prominence by establishing Hindavi Swarajya (meaning "self-rule of Hindus"). The Marathas became prominent in the 17th century under the leadership of Shivaji, who revolted against the Adil Shahi dynasty, and the Mughals to carve out a kingdom with Raigad as his capital.

His father, Shahaji, had earlier conquered Thanjavur which Shivaji's half-brother, Venkoji Rao (alias Ekoji) inherited. This kingdom was known as the Thanjavur Maratha kingdom. Bangalore which was established in 1537 by a vassal of the Vijayanagara Empire, Kempe Gowda I who declared independence, was captured in 1638 by a large Adil Shahi Bijapur army led by Ranadulla Khan who, accompanied by his second in command Shahaji, defeated Kempe Gowda III. As a result, Bangalore was given to Shahaji as a jagir (feudal estate). Known for their mobility, the Marathas were able to consolidate their territory during the Mughal–Maratha Wars and later controlled a large part of the Indian subcontinent.

Upon his release from Mughal captivity, Shahu became the Maratha ruler after a brief struggle with his aunt Tarabai, with the help of Balaji Vishwanath. Pleased by his help, Shahu appointed Balaji and later, his descendants, as the Peshwas or prime ministers of the empire. Balaji and his descendants played a key role in the expansion of Maratha rule. The empire, at its peak in 1758, stretched for a brief time from Tamil Nadu in the south, to Peshawar (modern-day Khyber Pakhtunkhwa, Pakistan) in the north, and Orissa & West Bengal up to the Hooghly River, in the east. However, they lost their occupations beyond Delhi, when the Maratha Army lost the Third Battle of Panipat in 1761. Ten years after Panipat, the young Peshwa Madhav Rao I's Maratha Resurrection reinstated Maratha authority over North India. The Marathas discussed abolishing the Mughal throne and placing Vishwas Rao on it in Delhi. 

To effectively manage the large empire, Madhav Rao gave semi-autonomy to the strongest of the knights, creating a confederacy of Maratha states. These leaders became known as the Gaekwads of Baroda, the Holkars of Indore and Malwa, the Scindias of Gwalior and Ujjain, the Bhonsales of Nagpur, the Jadhavs of Vidarbha, the Dabhades of Gujarat, the Puars of Dhar and Dewas. In 1775, the East India Company intervened in a Peshwa family succession struggle in Pune, which led to the First Anglo-Maratha War in which the Marathas emerged victorious. The Marathas remained the pre-eminent power in India until their defeat in the Second and Third Anglo-Maratha Wars (1805–1818), which resulted in the East India Company seizing control of most of the Indian subcontinent. The Maratha Empire came to an end in 1818, with its last Peshwa being Baji Rao II.

A large portion of the Maratha empire was coastline, which had been secured by the potent Maratha Navy under commanders such as Kanhoji Angre. He successfully kept foreign naval ships at bay, particularly those of the Portuguese and British. Securing the coastal areas and building land-based fortifications were crucial aspects of the Maratha's defensive strategy and regional military history.

Nomenclature 

The Maratha Empire is also referred to as the Maratha Confederacy. The historian Barbara Ramusack says that the former is a designation preferred by Indian nationalists, while the latter was that used by British historians. She notes, "neither term is fully accurate since one implies a substantial degree of centralisation and the other signifies some surrender of power to a central government and a longstanding core of political administrators".

Although at present, the word Maratha refers to a particular caste of warriors and peasants, in the past the word has been used to describe all Marathi people.

History 
The empire had its head in the Chhatrapati as de jure, but the de facto governance was in the hands of the Peshwas after Chhatrapati Shahu I's reign. After the death of Peshwa Madhavrao I, various chiefs played the role of the de facto rulers in their regions.

Shivaji and his descendants 

Shivaji (1630–1680) was a Maratha aristocrat of the Bhosale clan who is the founder of the Maratha empire. Shivaji led a resistance to free the people from the Sultanate of Bijapur in 1645 by winning the fort Torna, followed by many more forts, placing the area under his control and establishing Hindavi Swarajya (self-rule of Hindu people). He created an independent Maratha kingdom with Raigad as its capital and successfully fought against the Mughals to defend his kingdom. He was crowned as Chhatrapati (sovereign) of the new Maratha kingdom in 1674.

The Maratha dominion under him comprised about 4.1% of the subcontinent, but it was spread over large tracts. At the time of his death, it was reinforced with about 300 forts, and defended by about 40,000 cavalries, and 50,000 soldiers, as well as naval establishments along the west coast. Over time, the kingdom would increase in size and heterogeneity; by the time of his grandson's rule, and later under the Peshwas in the early 18th century, it was a full-fledged empire.

Shivaji had two sons: Sambhaji and Rajaram, who had different mothers and were half-brothers. In 1681, Sambhaji succeeded to the crown after his father's death and resumed his expansionist policies. Sambhaji had earlier defeated the Portuguese and Chikka Deva Raya of Mysore. To nullify the alliance between his rebel son, Akbar, and the Marathas, Mughal Emperor Aurangzeb headed south in 1681. With his entire imperial court, administration and an army of about 500,000 troops, he proceeded to expand the Mughal empire, gaining territories such as the sultanates of Bijapur and Golconda. During the eight years that followed, Sambhaji led the Marathas successfully against the Mughals.

In early 1689, Sambhaji called his commanders for a strategic meeting at Sangameshwar to consider an onslaught on the Mughal forces. In a meticulously planned operation, Ganoji and Aurangzeb's commander, Mukarrab Khan, attacked Sangameshwar when Sambhaji was accompanied by just a few men. Sambhaji was ambushed and captured by the Mughal troops on 1 February 1689. He and his advisor, Kavi Kalash, were taken to Bahadurgad by the imperial army, where they were executed by the Mughals on 21 March 1689. Aurangzeb had charged Sambhaji with attacks by Maratha forces on Burhanpur.

Upon Sambhaji's death, his half-brother Rajaram ascended the throne. The Mughal siege of Raigad continued, and he had to flee to Vishalgad and then to Gingee for safety. From there, the Marathas raided Mughal territory, and many forts were recaptured by Maratha commanders such as Santaji Ghorpade, Dhanaji Jadhav, Parshuram Pant Pratinidhi, Shankaraji Narayan Sacheev and Melgiri Pandit. In 1697, Rajaram offered a truce but this was rejected by Aurangzeb. Rajaram died in 1700 at Sinhagad. His widow, Tarabai, assumed control in the name of her son, Ramaraja (Shivaji II).

After Aurangzeb died in 1707, Shahu, the son of Sambhaji (and grandson of Shivaji), was released by Bahadur Shah I, the new Mughal emperor. However, his mother was kept a hostage of the Mughals to ensure that Shahu adhered to the release conditions. Upon release, Shahu immediately claimed the Maratha throne and challenged his aunt Tarabai and her son. The spluttering Mughal-Maratha war became a three-cornered affair. This resulted in two rival seats of government being set up in 1707 at Satara and Kolhapur by Shahu and Tarabai respectively. Shahu appointed Balaji Vishwanath as his Peshwa. The Peshwa was instrumental in securing Mughal recognition of Shahu as the rightful heir of Shivaji and the Chhatrapati of the Marathas. Balaji also gained the release of Shahu's mother, Yesubai, from Mughal captivity in 1719.

During Shahu's reign, Raghoji Bhosale expanded the empire Eastwards, reaching present-day Bengal. Khanderao Dabhade and later his son, Triambakrao, expanded it Westwards into Gujarat. Peshwa Bajirao and his three chiefs, Pawar (Dhar), Holkar (Indore), and Scindia (Gwalior), expanded it northwards up to Peshawar. He also expanded it up to Kaveri river.

Peshwa era 

During this era, Peshwas belonging to the Bhat family controlled the Maratha Army and later became de facto rulers of the Maratha Empire till 1772. In due course of time, the Maratha Empire dominated most of the Indian subcontinent.

Shahu appointed Peshwa Balaji Vishwanath in 1713. From his time, the office of Peshwa became supreme while Shahu became a figurehead. His first major achievement was the conclusion of the Treaty of Lonavala in 1714 with Kanhoji Angre, the most powerful naval chief on the Western Coast. He later accepted Shahu as Chhatrapati. In 1719, Marathas marched to Delhi after defeating Sayyid Hussain Ali, the Mughal governor of Deccan, and deposed the Mughal emperor. The Mughal Emperors became puppets in the hands of their Maratha overlords from this point on.

After Balaji Vishwanath's death in April 1720, his son, Baji Rao I, was appointed Peshwa by Shahu. Bajirao is credited with expanding the Maratha Empire tenfold from 3% to 30% of the modern Indian landscape during 1720–1740. He fought over 41 battles before his death in April 1740 and is reputed to have never lost any. The Battle of Palkhed was a land battle that took place on 28 February 1728 at the village of Palkhed, near the city of Nashik, Maharashtra, India between Baji Rao I and Qamar-ud-din Khan, Asaf Jah I of Hyderabad. The Marathas defeated the Nizam. The battle is considered an example of the brilliant execution of military strategy. In 1737, Marathas under Bajirao I raided the suburbs of Delhi in a blitzkrieg in the Battle of Delhi (1737). The Nizam set out from the Deccan to rescue the Mughals from the invasion of the Marathas, but was defeated decisively in the Battle of Bhopal. The Marathas extracted a large tribute from the Mughals and signed a treaty which ceded Malwa to the Marathas. The Battle of Vasai was fought between the Marathas and the Portuguese rulers of Vasai, a village lying on the northern shore of Vasai creek, 50 km north of Mumbai. The Marathas were led by Chimaji Appa, brother of Baji Rao. The Maratha victory in this war was a major achievement of Baji Rao's time in office.

Baji Rao's son, Balaji Bajirao (Nanasaheb), was appointed as the next Peshwa by Shahu despite the opposition of other chiefs. In 1740, the Maratha forces, under Raghoji Bhosale, came down upon Arcot and defeated the Nawab of Arcot, Dost Ali, in the pass at Damalcherry. In the war that followed, Dost Ali, one of his sons Hasan Ali, and a number of other prominent persons lost their lives. This initial success at once enhanced Maratha prestige in the south. From Damalcherry, the Marathas proceeded to Arcot, which surrendered to them without much resistance. Then, Raghuji invaded Trichinopoly in December 1740. Unable to resist, Chanda Sahib surrendered the fort to Raghuji on 14 March 1741. Chanda Saheb and his son were arrested and sent to Nagpur. Rajputana also came under Maratha domination during this time. In June 1756 Luís Mascarenhas, Count of Alva (Conde de Alva), the Portuguese Viceroy was killed in action by the Maratha Army in Goa.

After the successful campaign of Karnataka and the Trichinopolly, Raghuji returned from Karnataka. He undertook six expeditions into Bengal from 1741 to 1748.  The resurgent Maratha Empire launched brutal raids against the prosperous Bengali state in the 18th century, which further added to the decline of the Nawabs of Bengal. During their invasions and occupation of Bihar and western Bengal up to the Hooghly River, During their occupation of western Bengal, the Marathas perpetrated atrocities against the local population. The Maratha atrocities were recorded by both Bengali and European sources, which reported that the Marathas demanded payments, and tortured or killed anyone who couldn't pay.

Raghuji was able to annex Odisha to his kingdom permanently as he successfully exploited the chaotic conditions prevailing in Bengal after the death of its governor Murshid Quli Khan in 1727. Constantly harassed by the Bhonsles, Odisha, Bengal and parts of Bihar were economically ruined. Alivardi Khan, the Nawab of Bengal made peace with Raghuji in 1751 ceding Cuttack (Odisha) up to the river Subarnarekha, and agreeing to pay Rs. 1.2 million annually as the Chauth for Bengal and Bihar.

Balaji Bajirao encouraged agriculture, protected the villagers and brought about a marked improvement in the state of the territory. Raghunath Rao, brother of Nanasaheb, pushed into the wake of the Afghan withdrawal after Ahmed Shah Abdali's plunder of Delhi in 1756. Delhi was captured by the Maratha army under Raghunath Rao in August 1757, defeating the Afghan garrison in the Battle of Delhi. This laid the foundation for the Maratha conquest of North-west India. In Lahore, as in Delhi, the Marathas were now major players. After the 1758 Battle of Attock, the Marathas captured Peshawar defeating the Afghan troops in the Battle of Peshawar on 8 May 1758.

Just prior to the battle of Panipat in 1761, the Marathas looted "Diwan-i-Khas" or Hall of Private Audiences in the Red Fort of Delhi, which was the place where the Mughal emperors used to receive courtiers and state guests, in one of their expeditions to Delhi.

During the Maratha invasion of Rohilkhand in the 1750s

In 1760, the Marathas under Sadashivrao Bhau (referred to as the Bhau or Bhao in sources) responded to the news of the Afghans' return to North India by sending a large army north. Bhau's force was bolstered by some Maratha forces under Holkar, Scindia, Gaikwad and Govind Pant Bundele with Suraj Mal. The combined army of over 50,000 regular troops re-captured the former Mughal capital, Delhi, from an Afghan garrison in August 1760.

Delhi had been reduced to ashes many times due to previous invasions, and there was an acute shortage of supplies in the Maratha camp. Bhau ordered the sacking of the already depopulated city. He is said to have planned to place his nephew and the Peshwa's son, Vishwasrao, on the Mughal throne.

Ahmad Shah Durrani called on the Rohillas and the Nawab of Oudh to assist him in driving out the Marathas from Delhi. Huge armies of Muslim forces and Marathas collided with each other on 14 January 1761 in the Third Battle of Panipat. The Maratha Army lost the battle, which halted their imperial expansion. The Jats and Rajputs did not support the Marathas. Historians have criticised the Maratha treatment of fellow Hindu groups. Kaushik Roy says "The treatment of Marathas with their co-religionist fellows – Jats and Rajputs was definitely unfair After the battle, Malhar Rao Holkar attacked the Rajputs and defeated them at the battle of Mangrol. This largely restored Maratha power in Rajasthan.

The Marathas had antagonised the Jats and Rajputs by taxing them heavily, punishing them after defeating the Mughals and interfering in their internal affairs. The Marathas were abandoned by Raja Suraj Mal of Bharatpur, who quit the Maratha alliance at Agra before the start of the great battle and withdrew their troops as Maratha general Sadashivrao Bhau did not heed the advice to leave soldier's families (women and children) and pilgrims at Agra and not take them to the battle field with the soldiers, rejected their co-operation. Their supply chains (earlier assured by Raja Suraj Mal) did not exist.

Peshwa Madhavrao I was the fourth Peshwa of the Maratha Empire. It was during his tenure that the Maratha Resurrection took place. He worked as a unifying force in the Maratha Empire and moved to the south to subdue Mysore and the Nizam of Hyderabad to assert Maratha power. He sent generals such as Bhonsle, Scindia and Holkar to the north, where they re-established Maratha authority by the early 1770s. Madhav Rao I crossed the Krishna River in 1767 and defeated Hyder Ali in the battles of Sira and Madgiri. He also rescued the last queen of the Keladi Nayaka Kingdom, who had been kept in confinement by Hyder Ali in the fort of Madgiri. 

In early 1771, ten years after the collapse of Maratha authority over North India following the Third Battle of Panipat, Mahadji recaptured Delhi and installed Shah Alam II as a puppet ruler on the Mughal throne receiving in return the title of deputy Vakil-ul-Mutlak or vice-regent of the Empire and that of Vakil-ul-Mutlak being at his request conferred on the Peshwa. The Mughals also gave him the title of Amir-ul-Amara (head of the amirs). After taking control of Delhi, the Marathas sent a large army in 1772 to punish Afghan Rohillas for their involvement in Panipat. Their army devastated Rohilkhand by looting and plundering as well as taking members of the royal family as captives.Madhav Rao died in 1772, at the age of 27. His death is considered to be a fatal blow to the Maratha Empire and from that time Maratha power started to move on a downward trajectory, less an empire than a confederacy.

Confederacy era 

In a bid to effectively manage the large empire, Madhavrao Peshwa gave semi-autonomy to the strongest of the aristocracy. After the death of Peshwa Madhavrao I, various chiefs and jagirdars became de facto rulers and regents for the infant Peshwa Madhavrao II. Under the leadership of Mahadji Shinde, the ruler of the state of Gwalior in central India, the Marathas defeated the Jats, the Rohilla Afghans and took Delhi which remained under Maratha control for the next three decades. His forces conquered modern day Haryana. Shinde was instrumental in resurrecting Maratha power after the débâcle of the Third Battle of Panipat, and in this he was assisted by Benoît de Boigne.

After the growth in power of feudal lords like Malwa sardars, landlords of Bundelkhand and Rajput kingdoms of Rajasthan, they refused to pay tribute to Mahadji, so he sent his army to conquer the states such as Bhopal, Datiya, Chanderi, Narwar, Salbai and Gohad. However, he launched an unsuccessful expedition against the Raja of Jaipur, but withdrew after the inconclusive Battle of Lalsot in 1787. The Battle of Gajendragad was fought between the Marathas under the command of Tukojirao Holkar (the adopted son of Malharrao Holkar) and Tipu Sultan from March 1786 to March 1787 in which Tipu Sultan was defeated by the Marathas. By the victory in this battle, the border of the Maratha territory extended till Tungabhadra river. The strong fort of Gwalior was then in the hands of Chhatar Singh, the Jat ruler of Gohad. In 1783, Mahadji besieged the fort of Gwalior and conquered it. He delegated the administration of Gwalior to Khanderao Hari Bhalerao. After celebrating the conquest of Gwalior, Mahadji Shinde turned his attention to Delhi again.

In 1788, Mahadji's armies defeated Ismail Beg, a Mughal noble who resisted the Marathas. The Rohilla chief Ghulam Kadir, Ismail Beg's ally, took over Delhi, capital of the Mughal dynasty and deposed and blinded the king Shah Alam II, placing a puppet on the Delhi throne. Mahadji intervened and killed him, taking possession of Delhi on 2 October restoring Shah Alam II to the throne and acting as his protector. Jaipur and Jodhpur, the two most powerful Rajput states, were still out of direct Maratha domination. So, Mahadji sent his general Benoît de Boigne to crush the forces of Jaipur and Jodhpur at the Battle of Patan. Marwar was also captured on 10 September 1790. Another achievement of the Marathas was their victories over the Nizam of Hyderabad's armies including in the Battle of Kharda.

Maratha–Mysore Wars 

The Marathas came into conflict with Tipu Sultan and his Kingdom of Mysore, leading to the Maratha–Mysore War in 1785. The war ended in 1787 with the Tipu Sultan being defeated by Marathas. The Maratha-Mysore war ended in April 1787, following the finalizing of the treaty of Gajendragad, as per which, Tipu Sultan of Mysore was obligated to pay 4.8 million rupees as a war cost to the Marathas, and an annual tribute of 1.2 million rupees, in addition to returning all the territory captured by Hyder Ali,  In 1791–92, large areas of the Maratha Confederacy suffered massive population loss due to the Doji bara famine.

In 1791, irregulars like lamaans and pindaris of the Maratha army raided and looted the temple of Sringeri Shankaracharya, killing and wounding many people including Brahmins, plundering the monastery of all its valuable possessions, and desecrating the temple by displacing the image of goddess Sāradā. The incumbent Shankaracharya petitioned Tipu Sultan for help. A bunch of about 30 letters written in Kannada, which were exchanged between Tipu Sultan's court and the Sringeri Shankaracharya were discovered in 1916 by the Director of Archaeology in Mysore. Tipu Sultan expressed his indignation and grief at the news of the raid:

Tipu Sultan immediately ordered the Asaf of Bednur to supply the Swami with 200 rahatis (fanams) in cash and other gifts and articles. Tipu Sultan's interest in the Sringeri temple continued for many years, and he was still writing to the Swami in the 1790s.

The Maratha Empire soon allied with the British East India Company (based in the Bengal Presidency) against Mysore in the Anglo-Mysore Wars. After the British had suffered defeat against Mysore in the first two Anglo-Mysore Wars, the Maratha cavalry assisted the British in the last two Anglo-Mysore Wars from 1790 onwards, eventually helping the British conquer Mysore in the Fourth Anglo-Mysore War in 1799. After the British conquest, however, the Marathas launched frequent raids in Mysore to plunder the region, which they justified as compensation for past losses to Tipu Sultan.

British intervention 

In 1775, the British East India Company, from its base in Bombay, intervened in a succession struggle in Pune, on behalf of Raghunathrao (also called Raghobadada), who wanted to become Peshwa of the empire. Marathas forces under Tukojirao Holkar and Mahadaji Shinde defeated a British expeditionary force at the Battle of Wadgaon, but the heavy surrender terms, which included the return of annexed territory and a share of revenues, were disavowed by the British authorities at Bengal and fighting continued. What became known as the First Anglo-Maratha War ended in 1782 with a restoration of the pre-war status quo and the East India Company's abandonment of Raghunathrao's cause.

In 1799, Yashwantrao Holkar was crowned King of the Holkars and he captured Ujjain. He started campaigning towards the north to expand his empire in that region. Yashwant Rao rebelled against the policies of Peshwa Baji Rao II. In May 1802, he marched towards Pune the seat of the Peshwa. This gave rise to the Battle of Poona in which the Peshwa was defeated. After the Battle of Poona, the flight of the Peshwa left the government of the Maratha state in the hands of Yashwantrao Holkar. He appointed Amrutrao as the Peshwa and went to Indore on 13 March 1803. All except Gaikwad, chief of Baroda, who had already accepted British protection by a separate treaty on 26 July 1802, supported the new regime. He made a treaty with the British. Also, Yashwant Rao successfully resolved the disputes with Scindia and the Peshwa. He tried to unite the Maratha Confederacy but to no avail. In 1802, the British intervened in Baroda to support the heir to the throne against rival claimants and they signed a treaty with the new Maharaja recognising his independence from the Maratha Empire in return for his acknowledgment of British paramountcy. Before the Second Anglo-Maratha War (1803–1805), the Peshwa Baji Rao II signed a similar treaty. The defeat in Battle of Delhi, 1803 during the Second Anglo-Maratha War resulted in the loss of the city of Delhi for the Marathas.

The Second Anglo-Maratha War represents the military high-water mark of the Marathas who posed the last serious opposition to the formation of the British Raj. The real contest for India was never a single decisive battle for the subcontinent. Rather, it turned on a complex social and political struggle for the control of the South Asian military economy. The victory in 1803 hinged as much on finance, diplomacy, politics and intelligence as it did on battlefield maneuver and war itself.

Ultimately, the Third Anglo-Maratha War (1817–1818) resulted in the loss of Maratha independence. It left the British in control of most of the Indian subcontinent. The Peshwa was exiled to Bithoor (Marat, near Kanpur, Uttar Pradesh) as a pensioner of the British. The Maratha heartland of Desh, including Pune, came under direct British rule, with the exception of the states of Kolhapur and Satara, which retained local Maratha rulers (descendants of Shivaji and Sambhaji II ruled over Kolhapur). The Maratha-ruled states of Gwalior, Indore, and Nagpur all lost territory and came under subordinate alliances with the British Raj as princely states that retained internal sovereignty under British paramountcy. Other small princely states of Maratha knights were retained under the British Raj as well.

The Third Anglo-Maratha War was fought by Maratha warlords separately instead of forming a common front and they surrendered one by one. Shinde and the Pashtun Amir Khan were subdued by the use of diplomacy and pressure, which resulted in the Treaty of Gwalior on 5 November 1817. All other Maratha chiefs like Holkars, Bhonsles and the Peshwa gave up arms by 1818. British historian Percival Spear describes 1818 as a watershed year in the history of India, saying that by that year "the British dominion in India became the British dominion of India".

The war left the British, under the auspices of the British East India Company, in control of virtually all of present-day India south of the Sutlej River. The famed Nassak Diamond was looted by the company as part of the spoils of the war. The British acquired large chunks of territory from the Maratha Empire and in effect put an end to their most dynamic opposition. The terms of surrender Major-general John Malcolm offered to the Peshwa were controversial amongst the British for being too liberal: The Peshwa was offered a luxurious life near Kanpur and given a pension of about 80,000 pounds.

Rebellions 
In 1760, the peace of Peshwa government was broken by a rising of Kolis under their Naik Javji Bamble. Javji with drew to the hills and organised a series of gang robberies, causing widespread terror and misery throughout the country. For twenty years he held out bravely, defeating and killing the generals of the Peshwa's Government sent against him. At last he was so hotly pursued that, on the advice of Dhondo Gopal, the Peshwa's governor at Nasik, he surrendered all his forts to Tukoji Holkar and, through Holkar's influence, was pardoned and placed in military and police charge of a district of sixty villages with powers of life and death outlaws. In 1798, a fresh disturbance took place among the Kolis. The leader of this outbreak was Ramji Naik Bhangria, who was an abler and more daring man than his prede cessors, and succeeded in baffling all the efforts of the Government officers to seize him. As force seemed hopeless, the Government offered Ramji a pardon and gave him an important police post.

In 1763, the Peshwa Raghunathrao had appointed Abha Purandare who was an anti koli as Sarnaik, due to which the Chivhe Kolis revolted against the Peshwa and captured Purandar and Sinhagad forts because the Kolis did not like Abha Purandare, so Abha removed the Kolis from the fortification and posted new Kiledars, due to which the Kolis attacked and captured the forts on 7 May 1764. Five days later, Rudramal fort was also captured and presented a challenge to the Prime Minister of the Maratha Empire, Peshwa Raghunathrao. A few days later the Peshwa came to the fort to worship the deity inside the Purandar fort but the Peshwa got caught up by the Kolis. The Kolis looted all the belongings and weapons of the Peshwa and took him prisoner but released after some time. After this the Kolis started collecting revenue from the surrounding area. After this, the chief of the Kolis, Kondaji Chivhe, sent a letter to the Peshwa, in which it was written 'What now sir, what is the condition, how is the government doing, be in fun'. After reading this letter, the Peshwa felt a bit humiliated and in a fit of rage ordered the Maratha army to attack but the army could not do anything because the Kolis himselves were Subedar and had fortified the forts well and the Peshwa faced failure.  the humiliated Peshwa started taking the Kolis of Chivhe clan as captive. All those Chivhe kolis who were living in the territory of Peshwa were declared as rebels and started making captives. After this the Chivhe Kolis sent a letter to Madhavrao and explained whole matter, after this the Kolis handed over the forts to Madhavrao and the Chivahe Kolis were again handed over the fortifications.

In the year 1776, a large number of the Shelkande Kolis of Otur village, raised against Peshwa because of their hereditary land rights and as the Peshwa refused to do them.  Kolis assembled a revolutionary army of Shelkande and Kokate Kolis and commenced plundering the surrounding villages and doing other violent activities in the hope of obtaining redress.  In response, The Peshwa sent Maratha troops from Pune against rebel kolis and surprised them, killed and wounded many of them. The Koli leaders were consequently forced to disperse the rebels.  The government officers learned that Sattu Shelkande, chief of the insurgents, was hiding in the neighboring jungle.  The better to ensure this, they obliged him to enter into the Sunkli zamin or chain security (one Patil going security for two or three cultivators, another Patil for five or six poorer Patils, and a Deshmukh for a number of the Patils).  Hearing of the measures the government officers were adopting, moved off to another place;  this was partly for their own safety, and partly to save their friends from being harassed and punished for not fulfilling their promise of apprehending them.  After the troops retired from the jungles, the Kolis recommenced their operations.  Several seasons were passed in this way;  however when Javji Bamble was appointed as Mansabdar of Rajur he was ordered by Peshwa to prevent the rebellious activities by rebels.  Kolis did not wish to fight with Bumble because he was also a Koli by caste.  Kolis remained quiet for four years but Kolis went again to the jungles because his hereditary rights have not been fulfilled.  The troops employed against the Shelkande Kolis and again forced them to disperse and the chiefs went to Aurangabad.  Kolis had taken an oath that they would cut off the head of Patil of Otur, unless Peshwa afforded them redress.  Nana Phadnavis who was minister in Maratha Empire declared that he would not pardon the Kolis again, as they were such a turbulent race and as no faith could be reposed in them. Nana Fadnavis detached few Brahmins disguised as Gusai, who gained information of the hiding place of Kolis and a detachment that marched to apprehend them was so fortunate as to bring them all prisoners to Junnar, where the five Kolis were executed.  Balwantrao, brother-in-law to Nana Fadnavis, was subedar of the district at the time, and it is asserted Balwantrao became very unhappy after the execution of these kolis.  Therefore, in the hope of reestablishing the happiness that he had enjoyed, he erected a temple near river in Junnar, in which was placed as the object of worship a Punah Lingh, or five stones representing the five Kolis who were executed.

Geography 
The Maratha Empire, at its peak, encompassed a large area of the Indian sub-continent. The Maratha Empire at its zenith, expanded from Afghanistan in the north to Thanjavur in the south, Sindh in the west to Bengal in the east. It bordered Nepal and Afghanistan in the north. Apart from capturing various regions, the Marathas maintained a large number of tributaries who were bounded by agreements to pay a certain amount of regular tax, known as Chauth. The empire defeated the Sultanate of Mysore under Hyder Ali and Tipu Sultan, the Nawab of Oudh, the Nizam of Hyderabad, the Nawab of Bengal, Nawab of Sindh and the Nawab of Arcot as well as the Polygar kingdoms of South India. They extracted chauth from the rulers in Delhi, Oudh, Bengal, Bihar, Odisha, Punjab, Kumaon, Garhwal, Hyderabad, Mysore, Uttar Pradesh, Sindh and Rajputana. They built up the largest Hindu empire in India after the fall of the Gupta Empire on the 6th century.

The Marathas were requested by Safdarjung, the Nawab of Oudh, in 1752 to help him defeat the Afghani Rohillas. The Maratha force set out from Pune and defeated the Afghan Rohillas in 1752, capturing the whole of Rohilkhand (present-day northwestern Uttar Pradesh). In 1752, the Marathas entered into an agreement with the Mughal emperor, through his wazir, Safdarjung, and the Mughals gave the Marathas the chauth of Punjab, Sindh and Doab in addition to the Subahdari of Ajmer and Agra. In 1758, Marathas started their north-west conquest and expanded their boundary till Afghanistan. They defeated Afghan forces of Ahmed Shah Abdali, in what is now Pakistan, including Pakistani Punjab Province and Khyber Pakhtunkhwa. The Afghans were numbered around 25,000–30,000 and were led by Timur Shah, the son of Ahmad Shah Durrani. The Marathas massacred and looted thousands of Afghan soldiers and captured Lahore, Multan, Dera Ghazi Khan, Attock, Peshawar in the Punjab region and Kashmir. They also made sporadic raids in Afghanistan.

During the confederacy era, Mahadji Shinde resurrected the Maratha domination on much of North India, which was lost after the Third battle of Panipat including the cis-Sutlej states (south of Sutlej) like Kaithal, Patiala, Jind, Thanesar, Maler Kotla and Faridkot. Delhi and much of Uttar Pradesh were under the suzerainty of the Scindhias of the Maratha Empire, but following the Second Anglo-Maratha War of 1803–1805, the Marathas lost these territories to the British East India Company. The empire even after the defeat at Panipat expanded from Punjab in the north to Karnataka in the south.

Territorial evolution

Government and military

Administration 

(Chitnis)
 (Sachiv)

The Ashtapradhan (The Council of Eight) was a council of eight ministers that administered the Maratha empire. This system was formed by Shivaji. Ministerial designations were drawn from the Sanskrit language and comprised:

 Pantpradhan or Peshwa – Prime Minister, general administration of the Empire
 Amatya or Mazumdar – Finance Minister, managing accounts of the Empire
 Sachiv – Secretary, preparing royal edicts
 Mantri – Interior Minister, managing internal affairs especially intelligence and espionage
 Senapati – Commander-in-Chief, managing the forces and defence of the Empire
 Sumant – Foreign Minister, to manage relationships with other sovereigns
 Nyayadhyaksh – Chief Justice, dispensing justice on civil and criminal matters
 Panditrao – High Priest, managing internal religious matters
 "Chitnis" - Personal Secretary and senior writer of the Chhatrapati. Sometimes considered second to the Peshwa in the absence of the Peshwa, NOT in the Ashta Pradhan Mandal but equal to.

With the notable exception of the priestly Panditrao and the judicial Nyayadisha, the other pradhans held full-time military commands and their deputies performed their civil duties in their stead. In the later era of the Maratha Empire, these deputies and their staff constituted the core of the Peshwa's bureaucracy.

The Peshwa was the titular equivalent of a modern Prime Minister. Shivaji created the Peshwa designation in order to more effectively delegate administrative duties during the growth of the Maratha Empire. Prior to 1749, Peshwas held office for 8–9 years and controlled the Maratha Army. They later became the de facto hereditary administrators of the Maratha Empire from 1749 till its end in 1818.

Under the administration of the Peshwas and with the support of several key generals and diplomats (listed below), the Maratha Empire reached its zenith, ruling most of the Indian subcontinent. It was also under the Peshwas that the Maratha Empire came to its end through its formal annexation into the British Empire by the British East India Company in 1818.

The Marathas used a secular policy of administration and allowed complete freedom of religion.

Shivaji was an able administrator who established a government that included modern concepts such as cabinet, foreign policy and internal intelligence. He established an effective civil and military administration. He believed that there was a close bond between the state and the citizens. He is remembered as a just and welfare-minded king. Cosme da Guarda says of him that:

The Marathas carried out a number of sea raids, such as plundering Mughal Naval ships and European trading vessels. European traders described these attacks as piracy, but the Marathas viewed them as legitimate targets because they were trading with, and thus financially supporting, their Mughal and Bijapur enemies. After the representatives of various European powers signed agreements with Shivaji or his successors, the threat of plundering or raids against Europeans began to reduce.

Military 

The Maratha army under Shivaji was a national army consisting of personnel drawn mainly from Maharashtra. It was a homogeneous body commanded by a regular cadre of officers, who had to obey one supreme commander. With the rise of the Peshwas, however, this national army had to make room for a feudal force provided by different Maratha sardars. This new Maratha army was not homogenous, but employed soldiers of different backgrounds, both locals and foreign mercenaries, including large numbers of Arabs, Sikhs, Rajputs, Sindhis, Rohillas, Abyssinians, Pathans, Topiwalas and Europeans. The army of Nana Fadnavis, for example, included 5,000 Arabs.

Some historians have credited the Maratha Navy for laying the foundation of the Indian Navy and bringing significant changes in naval warfare. A series of sea forts and battleships were built in the 17th century during the reign of Shivaji. It has been noted that vessels built in the dockyards of Konkan were mostly indigenous and constructed without foreign aid. Further, in the 18th century, during the reign of Admiral Kanhoji Angre, a host of dockyard facilities were built along the entire western coastline of present-day Maharashtra. The Marathas fortified the entire coastline with sea fortresses with navigational facilities. Nearly all the hill forts, which dot the landscape of present-day western Maharashtra were built by the Marathas. The renovation of Gingee fortress in Tamil Nadu, has been particularly applauded, according to the contemporary European accounts, the defence fortifications matched the European ones.

Afghan accounts 

The Maratha army, especially its infantry, was praised by almost all the enemies of the Maratha Empire, ranging from the Duke of Wellington to Ahmad Shah Abdali. After the Third Battle of Panipat, Abdali was relieved as the Maratha army in the initial stages were almost in the position of destroying the Afghan armies and their Indian Allies, the Nawab of Oudh and Rohillas. The grand wazir of the Durrani Empire, Sardar Shah Wali Khan was shocked when Maratha commander-in-chief Sadashivrao Bhau launched a fierce assault on the centre of Afghan Army, over 10,000 Durrani soldiers were killed alongside Haji Atai Khan, one of the chief commander of Afghan army and nephew of wazir Shah Wali Khan. Such was the fierce assault of the Maratha infantry in hand-to-hand combat that Afghan armies started to flee and the wazir in desperation and rage shouted, "Comrades Whither do you fly, our country is far off". Post battle, Ahmad Shah Abdali in a letter to one Indian ruler claimed that Afghans were able to defeat the Marathas only because of the blessings of almighty and any other army would have been destroyed by the Maratha army on that particular day even though the Maratha army was numerically inferior to the Afghan army and its Indian allies. Though Abdali won the battle, he also had heavy casualties on his side. So, he sought immediate peace with the Marathas. Abdali wrote in his letter to Peshwa on 10 February 1761:

European accounts 

Similarly, the Duke of Wellington, after defeating the Marathas, noted that the Marathas, though poorly led by their Generals, had regular infantry and artillery that matched the level of that of the Europeans and warned other British officers from underestimating the Marathas on the battlefield. He cautioned one British general: "You must never allow Maratha infantry to attack head on or in close hand-to-hand combat as in that your army will cover itself with utter disgrace". Even when Arthur Wellesley, 1st Duke of Wellington, became the Prime Minister of Britain, he held the Maratha infantry in utmost respect, claiming it to be one of the best in the world. However, at the same time, he noted the poor leadership of Maratha Generals, who were often responsible for their defeats. Charles Metcalfe, one of the ablest of the British Officials in India and later acting Governor-General, wrote in 1806: 

Norman Gash says that the Maratha infantry was equal to that of British infantry. After the Third Anglo-Maratha war in 1818, Britain listed the Marathas as one of the Martial Races to serve in the British Indian Army. The 19th-century diplomat Sir Justin Sheil commented about the British East India Company copying the French Indian army in raising an army of Indians:

Rulers, administrators and generals

Royal houses 

 Shivaji (1630–1680)
 Sambhaji (1657–1689)
 Rajaram Chhatrapati (1670–1700)

Satara:

 Shahu I (alias Shivaji II, son of Sambhaji)
 Ramaraja II (nominally, grandson of Rajaram and Queen Tarabai)
 Shahu II
 Pratap Singh – signed a treaty with the East India company ceding part of the sovereignty of his Kingdom to the company

Kolhapur:

 Tarabai (1675–1761) (wife of Rajaram) in the name of her son Shivaji II
 Shivaji II (1700–1714)
 Sambhaji II (1714 to 1760) – came to power by deposing his half brother Shivaji II
 Shivaji III (1760–1812) (adopted from the family of Khanwilkar)

Peshwas 

 Moropant Trimbak Pingle (1657–1683)
 Nilakanth Moreshvar Pingale (1683–1689)
 Ramchandra Pant Amatya (1689–1708)
 Bahiroji Pingale (1708–1711)
 Parshuram Trimbak Kulkarni (1711–1713)

Peshwas from the Bhat family 

From Balaji Vishwanath onwards, the actual power gradually shifted to the Bhat family of Peshwas based in Poona.

 Balaji Vishwanath (1713–1720)
 Bajirao (1720–1740)
 Balaji Bajirao (4 Jul 1740 – 23 Jun 1761) (born 8 Dec 1721, d. 23 Jun 1761)
 Madhavrao Peshwa (1761 – 18 Nov 1772) (born 16 Feb 1745, d. 18 Nov 1772)
 Narayanrao Bajirao (13 Dec 1772 – 30 Aug 1773) (born 10 Aug 1755, d. 30 Aug 1773)
 Raghunathrao (5 Dec 1773 – 1774) (born 18 Aug 1734, d. 11 Dec 1783)
 Sawai Madhava Rao II Narayan (1774 – 27 Oct 1795) (born 18 Apr 1774, d. 27 Oct 1795)
 Baji Rao II (6 Dec 1796 – 3 Jun 1818) (died 28 Jan 1851)

Federal houses of Maratha Confederacy 

 Holkars of Indore
 Scindias of Gwalior
 Gaikwads of Baroda
 Bhonsales of Nagpur
 Bhonsales of Thanjavur
 Puars of Dewas and Dhar
 Patwardhans
Bhoite's of Jalgaon, Aradgaon
Newalkars of Jhansi
Vinchurkars

Thanjavur Marathas

The Thanjavur Marathas were the rulers of the Thanjavur Maratha kingdom in present day Tamil Nadu between the 17th and 19th centuries. Their native language was Thanjavur Marathi. Venkoji, Shahaji's son and Shivaji's half-brother, was the founder of the dynasty. They were patrons of fine arts and their reign has been considered the golden period of Tanjore history. Art and culture reached new heights during their rule. They also considered themselves as representatives of Cholas referring themselves as Cholasimhasanathipathi. They made significant contributions towards Sanskrit and Marathi literature, Bharatanatyam (dance form), and Carnatic music.

See also 
 Battles involving the Maratha Empire
 List of Maratha dynasties and states
 List of people involved in the Maratha Empire
 Maratha titles
 Maratha War of Independence

References

Footnotes

Citations

Bibliography

Further reading 

 
 
 Wink, Andre. Land and Sovereignty in India: Agrarian Society and Politics under the Eighteenth Century Maratha Swarajya, (Cambridge UP, 1986).
 Apte, B.K. (editor) – Chhatrapati Shivaji: Coronation Tercentenary Commemoration Volume, Bombay: University of Bombay (1974–75)
 Desai, Ranjeet – Shivaji the Great, Janata Raja (1968), Pune: Balwant Printers – English Translation of popular Marathi book.

External links

Maratha Empire
1674 establishments in India
1818 disestablishments in India
Dynasties of India
Empires and kingdoms of India
Maharashtra
Former confederations
Former countries in South Asia
Historical Hindu empires
States and territories established in 1674
States and territories disestablished in 1818